Upper Battlefield is a small village in Shropshire, England.

It lies on the A49 just north of Battlefield. The Welsh Marches railway line runs through the village, and it lies in the parish of Astley.

Recent developments between the village and the town of Shrewsbury have almost merged the two settlements. Upon the recent completion of the new service station and livestock market site at the Battlefield Roundabout, there is only a small field separating the town and Upper Battlefield.

External links

Villages in Shropshire